Konstantinos Pavlopoulos (born 26 December 1971) is a retired Greek football defender.

Honours

Player
AEK Athens 
Greek Cup: 1995–96, 1996–97

References

1971 births
Living people
Greek footballers
Association football defenders
Naoussa F.C. players
Panathinaikos F.C. players
OFI Crete F.C. players
AEK Athens F.C. players
Ethnikos Piraeus F.C. players
Super League Greece players
Super League Greece 2 players
Greece international footballers